Battle of Kaukaba was a skirmish that took place on May 9, 1978 when PLO soldiers attacked Norwegian peacekeepers. The battle took place only a few days after the first Norwegian troops arrived in Lebanon. The Norwegian military released the sound recordings from the battle in 2008.

The skirmish is regarded as one of the hardest battles fought by Norwegian soldiers in the UNIFIL force, and the PLO soldiers got as close as 30 meters. Throughout the skirmish, the Norwegians fired about 200 machine gun shots, 50 shots from automatic weapons and two Carl Gustav RFK grenades. The PLO fired about ten times more shots from hand weapons, as well as eight gun grenades. Eventually the PLO gave up, and pledged not to fire at the Norwegians again. One Norwegian suffered light injuries during the attack. Official PLO casualties were one dead and one wounded. The Norwegian soldiers believed the real number of Palestinians dead to be closer to eight.

References

Conflicts in 1978
1978 in Norway
Lebanese Civil War
Kaukaba
May 1978 events in Asia